Hattori-ohike Dam  is an earthfill dam located in Hiroshima Prefecture in Japan. The dam is used for irrigation. The catchment area of the dam is 22 km2. The dam impounds about 17  ha of land when full and can store 650 thousand cubic meters of water. The construction of the dam was started on 1989 and completed in 1997.

References

Dams in Hiroshima Prefecture